Mesh is a type of physical material distinguished by connected and crossing strands

Mesh or MESH may also refer to:

In science
 Mesh (scale), a measurement scale for small particles
 Abbreviated structural formula of the chemical methanethiol (MeSH)
 Number sign
 An elemental electrical circuit loop, used in mesh analysis

In computing and mathematics
 A description of an object by a collection of small simple shapes, commonly used in numerical simulations and computer graphics
 Types of mesh in computational mathematics
 Polygon mesh, a partition into polygons
 Mesh (mathematics), a partition of an interval
 Mesh generation or "grid generation" or "meshing," algorithms and software for creating meshes
 Mesh network, a highly interconnected network of computers or networking hardware
 Windows Live Mesh, free synchronization and Remote Desktop software from Microsoft
 "Macintosh Enhanced SCSI Hardware" (MESH), the Power Macintosh MESH SCSI controller
 MESH (cipher), an encryption algorithm
 Mesh Computers, a British computer manufacturer
 Bluetooth mesh, networking standard by Bluetooth SIG

In popular culture
 Mesh (band), a British synthpop band
 Modern Day Zero, a St. Louis rock band previously known as "Mesh" and "Mesh STL"
 Mesh, an alias used by Dutch trance musician Jack Molenschot
Meshes (EP), an EP by Pram

In medicine
 Surgical mesh, used to support and repair organs and tissues during surgery
 MeSH, an acronym for Medical Subject Headings

In apparel 

 Mesh is a collective term for a variety of very thin, breathable and often see-through fabrics used in bridal wear, lingerie and sports wear.

Food
 Mish, a traditional Egyptian cheese that is made by fermenting salty cheese for several months or years.

Other
 M.E.S.H., a 1966-formed consortium of European missile manufacturers - Matra, ERNO, Saab AB and Hawker Siddeley Dynamics

See also
Grid (disambiguation)
Lattice (disambiguation)
 Mash (disambiguation)